IIII is the fourth studio album by German DJ and record producer Robin Schulz, released on 26 February 2021 through Warner Music. Schulz wrote around 50 songs over the span of four years for the album, which features collaborations conducted online due to the COVID-19 pandemic. IIII was supported by the singles "Speechless", "All This Love", "Rather Be Alone", "In Your Eyes", "Alane", and "All We Got". A seventh single, "One More Time" with Felix Jaehn, was released the same day as the album. The album's release was promoted by a drone light show in the Netherlands.

Singles
"Speechless" was released as the lead single from the album on 16 November 2018. The song peaked at number seven on the German Singles Chart. "All This Love" was released as the second single from the album on 3 May 2019. The song peaked at number twenty-four on the German Singles Chart. "Rather Be Alone" was released as the third single from the album on 13 September 2019. "In Your Eyes" was released as the fourth single from the album on 10 January 2020. The song peaked at number five on the German Singles Chart. "Alane" was released as the fifth single from the album on 19 June 2020. The song peaked at number six on the German Singles Chart. "All We Got" was released as the sixth single from the album on 16 October 2020. The song peaked at number five on the German Singles Chart. "One More Time" was released as the seventh single from the album on 26 February 2021. The song peaked at number forty-six on the German Singles Chart.

Critical reception
Der Spiegel rated the album 2/10, and calling it too "comfortable" and criticizing the "pseudo-emotional" guest appearances. 24UR gave the album a rating of 3.5/5, praising the trance influences and use of non-electronic instruments like guitars. A review by laut.de gave IIII one out of five stars and felts its songs were unoriginal and repetitive.

Track listing

Charts

Weekly charts

Year-end charts

Certifications

References

2021 albums
Robin Schulz albums
Warner Music Group albums